Stanisław "Cat" Mackiewicz (18 December 1896 in Saint Petersburg, Russia – 18 February 1966 in Warsaw, Poland) was a conservative Polish writer, journalist and monarchist.

Interwar journalist Adolf Maria Bocheński called him the foremost political journalist of the interbellum Second Polish Republic.

Life
Mackiewicz was born into a Polish family that had historically used the Bożawola coat-of-arms.

Mackiewicz joined the Polish Military Organisation in 1917 and served as a volunteer in the Polish Army during the Polish-Soviet War of 1919–21. He published and the editor-in-chief of the independent Wilno (Vilnius) periodical titled "Słowo," wholly financially supported by the noble families of the former Grand Duchy of Lithuania. He actively promoted the idea of the so-called Jagellonian Poland, i.e., return to the Polish–Lithuanian Commonwealth style of governance in Eastern Europe.

He supported Józef Piłsudski and in 1928–35 served as a deputy to the Sejm (Poland's parliament), representing the Piłsudskiite Nonpartisan Bloc for Cooperation with the Government.

After Piłsudski's death in 1935, Mackiewicz criticized the ruling elite and in 1939 was imprisoned for 17 days at the Bereza Kartuska detention camp.

On 18 September 1939, a day after the Soviet attack on eastern Poland during the Soviet-German Invasion of Poland, he left Poland.

Following the Yalta Conference and subsequent occupation by Stalin of Poland and the later establishment of the Communist Poland, Mackiewicz, like so many other  political exiles, remained abroad and was politically active in the Polish émigré community. He served as prime minister of the Polish government-in-exile in 1954–55.

In 1956, Mackiewicz returned to Poland, where he continued writing under the pseudonym of Gaston de Cerizay. In 1964 he was one of the signatories of the so-called Letter of 34 to Prime Minister Józef Cyrankiewicz regarding freedom of culture.

He was the older brother of ardent enemy of the communist system, writer Józef Mackiewicz.

Works 
 Historja Polski od 11 listopada 1918 r. do 17 września 1939 r. (The History of Poland from 11 November 1918 to 17 September 1939), 1941, 1958, 1989, 1990, 1992
 Stanisław August, 1953, 1978, 1991, 1999, 2009
 Muchy chodzą po mózgu (Flies Walk the Brain), 1957
 Zielone oczy (Green Eyes), 1958, 1959, 1987
 Europa in flagranti (Europe in flagranti), 1965, 1975, 2000
 Odeszli w zmierzch: wybór pism, 1916–1966 (They Have Passed into the Twilight:  a Collection of Writings, 1916–1966), 1968
 Kto mnie wołał, czego chciał... (Who Called Me, What He Wanted...), Instytut Wydawniczy "Pax" ("Pax" Publishing Institute), 1972
 Był bal (There Was a Ball), 1973
 Herezje i prawdy (Heresies and Truths), 1975
 Klucz do Piłsudskiego (The Key to Piłsudski), 1986, 1992, 1996
 Lata nadziei: 17 września 1939 – 5 lipca 1945 (Years of Hope:  17 September 1939 – 5 July 1945), 1990
 Myśl w obcęgach: studia nad psychologią społeczeństw sowietów (Thinking in a Vise:  Studies on the Psychology of Soviet Societies), 1998
 Polityka Becka (Beck's Policies), 2009
 Teraz jestem tutaj. Albo może raczej nigdzie = Now I'm here. Or perhaps, rather, nowhere, edited by Tomasz Wiech and Maciej Zakrzewski. Kraków: IPN, 2014. Photographs taken in London from 1945 to 1956.

See also
List of Poles

Notes 

1896 births
1966 deaths
Military personnel from Saint Petersburg
People from Sankt-Peterburgsky Uyezd
Polish nobility
Polish Roman Catholics
Nonpartisan Bloc for Cooperation with the Government politicians
Members of the Sejm of the Second Polish Republic (1928–1930)
Members of the Sejm of the Second Polish Republic (1930–1935)
Association of the Polish Youth "Zet" members
PAX Association members
Polish monarchists
Polish anti-communists
Polish conservatives
Polish exiles
Polish male writers
Polish political writers
Roman Catholic writers
Inmates of Bereza Kartuska Prison
Polish people of the Polish–Soviet War
Burials at Powązki Cemetery
20th-century Polish journalists
People associated with the magazine "Kultura"